The Cunningham Inside-Drive Limousine-146-A was manufactured by the Cunningham Carriage Company which produced luxury automobiles between 1908 and 1931.

Cunningham Inside-Drive Limousine-146-A specifications (1926 data) 

 Color – Optional
 Seating Capacity – Seven
 Wheelbase – 142 inches
 Wheels – Wire, wood, or disc
 Tires - 33” x 6.75” balloon
 Service Brakes – 4-wheel Perrot-Bendix servo-expand
 Engine  - Eight cylinder, V-type, 90°, cast en block, 3-3/4 x 5 inches; head removable; valves in side; H.P. 45 N.A.C.C. rating
 Lubrication – Full force feed
 Crankshaft - Three bearing
 Radiator – Cellular
 Cooling – Water pump
 Ignition – Storage Battery
 Starting System – Two Unit
 Voltage – Six 
 Wiring System – Single
 Gasoline System – Vacuum
 Clutch – Dry multiple disc
 Transmission – Selective sliding
 Gear Changes – 4 forward, 1 reverse
 Drive – Spiral bevel
 Rear Springs – Three-quarter elliptic
 Rear Axle – Full-floating
 Steering Gear – Worm and gear

Standard equipment
New car price included the following items:
 tools
 speedometer
 ammeter
 voltmeter
 motometer
 ignition theft lock
 automatic windshield cleaner
 spare wheels
 power tire pump
 shock absorbers
 spot light
 front bumper
 spare tire carriers
 luggage rack
 clock
 closed cars have smoking case, vanity cases, and dome light

Prices
New car prices were F.O.B. factory, plus Tax:
 Roadster - $6150 ($78,878.46 in 2012)
 Four Passenger Touring - $6150 ($78,878.46 in 2012)
 Six Passenger Touring - $6650 ($85,291.34 in 2012)
 Seven Passenger Touring - $6650 ($85,291.34 in 2012)
 Four Passenger Sedan - $7600 ($97,475.82 in 2012)
 Inside-Drive Limousine - $8100 ($103,888.70 in 2012)
 Inside-Drive Cabriolet - $8100 ($103,888.70 in 2012)
 French Brougham - $8100 ($103,888.70 in 2012)
 Cabriolet - $8100 ($103,888.70 in 2012)

See also
 Cunningham automobile

References
Source: 

Cars of the United States